The British Alpine goat is a breed of domestic goat developed in the early 1900s. A standard British Alpine goat is black all over with white 'Swiss' markings. Another well-known breed that has these markings is the Toggenburg goat, and the breed was developed from the Toggenburg, native British goats, and Nubian genetics. The British Alpine is a high producer of quality goats' milk, and the breed can be found in many goat dairies as an acceptable milker. These goats are capable of extended lactations, sometimes even lasting close to two years.

Origins 

The British Alpine goat was developed in the early 1900s from other breeds including the Toggenburg, which also has the same "Swiss" markings, (as the Toggenburg originated in Switzerland), native British goats and also includes Nubian genetics. The British Alpine was introduced into Australia in 1958, and is distributed throughout the country, but perhaps not as much as other breeds such as the Saanen.

Breed Standards 

The British Alpine is a large goat in appearance. They are normally black with white Swiss markings, however sometimes a fully black animal may occur, often known as "all black" or "black Saanen" goats. This is due to a recessive gene. British Alpine goats have a typical "wedge" shape that is predominant in some other breeds of dairy goat. They are often disbudded, alike many other dairy goats. There are also some poll strains in the breed. A standard animal has a straight muzzle line, well-set eyes, erect ears, good-sized teats (female), lack of tassels (small flaps of skin, usually two, on the neck, however some British Alpines appear with tassels) and are overall a well-defined, neatly built goat. Their sleek black coat may lighten due to a lack of copper in the diet, which is one of the most essential minerals to all goats and the colour of the coat may indicate their copper intake.

Milking 

British Alpines are excellent milkers, well known for their extended lactations. They also have a well-known ability to keep milking through the colder months. These goats have good-sized teats, which allow easier milking. They are a good producer of high-quality milk.

Breed Management 

British Alpines are active goats. They are not suited to indoors or feedlot-type operations, they perform their best free-range.

See also
Alpine (goat)

References

External links
British Alpine website
British Alpine

Goat breeds originating in the United Kingdom
Goat breeds